Robin Spielberg (born November 20, 1962) is a Billboard charts American pianist, composer and author. Raised in the suburban town of Maplewood, New Jersey, she attended Michigan State University and later Tisch School of the Arts at New York University, graduating from NYU with honors and a BFA in Undergraduate Drama. She has released twenty-one albums of piano music. She currently lives in New Freedom, Pennsylvania.

Early life
Robin Spielberg's paternal grandfather, Rubin Spielberg, was a flutist with the NBC Symphony Orchestra under the direction of Arturo Toscanini. Although they never met, in her memoir she credits him with providing creative inspiration. She began formal piano lessons at the age of seven.

Theater
She is a founding member of the Atlantic Theater Company and acted in dozens of plays with the company including Boys' Life (which was nominated for a Drama Desk award for Outstanding Ensemble Performance)   and The Lights by Howard Korder at Lincoln Center. She composed music for several Atlantic Theater Company productions including the David Mamet adaptation of Three Sisters directed by William H. Macy and two children's plays written by David Mamet airing on National Public Radio (NPR): The Poet and the Rent and The Revenge of the Space Pandas. In 1992, Spielberg and Barry Shulak co-wrote a musical for young audiences entitled Balloonland. Originally produced in Vermont by the Atlantic Theater Company,  Balloonland later debuted off-Broadway on ATC's New York City stage in 1993.

Albums and awards
As of 2021, Spielberg had recorded twenty-one albums and appeared on over fifty compilations. Her debut album of original piano solos entitled Heal of the Hand was recorded independently in 1993. The album was picked up by the indie label North Star Music in 1994, and became their best-selling CD of the decade. According to North Star president Richard Waterman, Spielberg sold between 160,000 and 200,000 albums during 1995 and 1996, although SoundScan only registered 1,800 sales, with the bulk of sales through specialist outlets. By 1999 she had reportedly sold 300,000 albums.

Spielberg's original 1994 agreement with North Star Music was a six-record deal, covering recording and release of two albums per year over the course of three years. During this period, the following titles were released under the North Star label: Heal of the Hand (1993), Spirit of the Holidays (1994) featuring Christmas-themed tracks, Unchained Melodies (1995), In the Heart of Winter (1995), Songs of the Spirit (1996), and In the Arms of the Wind (1997). Additional titles subsequently released by North Star include Mother (1999) and Spa Piano (2007). The former is a collaboration with singers Cathie Ryan and Susan McKeown featuring songs celebrating motherhood. When North Star folded in 2011, Spielberg bought back the masters for her albums released under that label.

Beginning in 2000, Spielberg started releasing albums under her own playMountain Music label. Titles released under playMountain Music are Beautiful Dreamer (2000), Dreaming of Summer (2000), The Christmas Collection (2002), American Chanukah (2002), With a Song in My Heart (2004), Memories of Utopia (2005), A New Kind of Love (2008), Sea to Shining Sea: A Tapestry of American Music (2010), Another Time, Another Place (2015), On The Edge Of A Dream: Piano Solos For Dreaming (2018), Love Story (2020), Re-Inventions (2020), and Give My Regards to Broadway (2021). Another Time, Another Place was nominated for a Zone Music Award and on May 7, 2016 she performed at the awards show at the Joy Theater New Orleans, Louisiana.
The album was also nominated for a Whisperings Solo Piano Radio Award  and a One World Music Radio award in the UK.
In March 2018 Spielberg debuted at number 6 in the Billboard New Age Charts with her album On The Edge Of A Dream: Piano Solos For Dreaming. The CD was ranked number 7 on the Zone Music Reporter radio charts for the months of June and July 2018. http://www.zonemusicreporter.com/charts/top100.asp

In addition to her recording career, Spielberg served as an inaugural member of the 'Independent Music Awards' judging panel.

Spielberg was added to the Steinway Artist roster in 1996.

During 2022 she was nominated by the Hollywood Music in Media Awards for her epic piece 'Ireland: An Orchestral Portrait' .

Performances
Spielberg tours both nationally and overseas. Performance highlights within the United States include three sold-out performances at the Weill Recital Hall at Carnegie Hall (New York City). Overseas, she has toured South Korea three times appearing at KBS Hall, Seoul Arts Center and the LG Arts Center (2010). Spielberg is signed with Sony/ATV Music Publishing in Asia and her piece "An Improvisation on the Canon in D" is used in the soundtrack of the South Korean television drama series Winter Sonata 

In January 2015 Spielberg began opening for the renowned songwriter Jimmy Webb at the Sharp Theater, Mahwah, New Jersey, both are represented by Kosson Talent.

In July 2019, The Chinese Ministry of Culture and Tourism invited Spielberg to perform concerts and give piano performance master classes and workshops. The three week tour included performances in the Zhejiang Province at The Hangzhou Grand Theater, The Keqiao Lantian Grand Theatre, The Longquan Grand Theatre, The Xiangshan Theatre, The Changxing Grand Theatre, as well as The Gengsu Theater in Jiangsu, The Puxian Grand Theatre in Fujian Province and MAO Livehouse in Shanghai.

Music therapy
The importance of music therapy is a recurring theme throughout Spielberg's career. She is a national celebrity artist spokesperson for the American Music Therapy Association. As spokesperson, Spielberg often conducts seminars and workshops on the transformative power of music in hospitals, schools and community centers while on tour. She has also performed fundraisers for medical  and other charities. 
In 2014 Spielberg was invited to give a TEDx talk on The Healing Power of Music in Lancaster, Pennsylvania's inaugural TEDx event.

Writing
Spielberg is author of the memoir Naked on the Bench (2013), which Kirkus called a "well-paced musical memoir about the value of perseverance" which avoids sentimentality and balances happy moments with darker content such as being stalked. Spielberg also writes about music therapy in her memoir.

Teaching
In 2016, Spielberg began teaching at Millersville University as an instructor in the music business technology department, teaching Careers in the Music Business and International Music Business.

Discography
 Heal of the Hand (1993)
 Spirit of the Holidays (1994)
 Unchained Melodies (1995)
 In the Heart of Winter (1995)
 Songs of the Spirit (1996)
 In the Arms of the Wind (1997)
 Mother (1999)
 Beautiful Dreamer (2000)
 Dreaming of Summer (2000)
 The Christmas Collection (2002)
 American Chanukah (2002)
 With a Song in My Heart (2004)
 Memories of Utopia (2005)
 Spa Piano (2007)
 A New Kind of Love (2008)
 Sea to Shining Sea: A Tapestry of American Music (2010)
 Another Time, Another Place (2015)
 On the Edge of A Dream (2018)
 Love Story (2020)
 Re-Inventions (2020)
 Give My Regards to Broadway (2021)
 Ireland: An Orchestral Portrait (2022)

References

Sources
Spielberg, Robin, Naked on the Bench: My Adventures in Pianoland, A Memoir,  Spobs Music Incorporated 2013;

External links

Agency

Jewish American musicians
Musicians from New Jersey
Living people
1962 births
Michigan State University alumni
20th-century American composers
20th-century American pianists
People from New Freedom, Pennsylvania
20th-century American women pianists
21st-century American pianists
21st-century American women pianists
20th-century women composers
21st-century American Jews